Cleator Moor    is a town and civil parish in Cumbria, England, within the historic county of Cumberland. It had a population of 6,936 at the 2011 census.

Below Dent Fell, the town is on the  Coast to Coast Walk that spans Northern England. On the outskirts of the town lies the village of Cleator. It was populated by Irish immigrants in the latter half of the nineteenth century, leading to the colloquial title of Little Ireland.

Governance
Cleator Moor is within the Copeland UK Parliamentary constituency, Trudy Harrison is the Member of parliament.

Before Brexit, it was in the North West England European Parliamentary Constituency.

Industry
Historically in Cumberland, the town was based around the iron works industry and was served in this capacity by two railways. The Whitehaven, Cleator and Egremont Railway (WC&ER) was the first railway on the scene and it opened for goods traffic in 1855, then two years later it opened for passenger traffic.  The WC&ER sold out to the London and North Western Railway in 1878 but when the Furness Railway objected to the sale it too became a partner, thus forming the Furness & London and North Western Joint Railway the following year. The second railway to serve Cleator Moor was the Cleator & Workington Junction Railway. This new company had a station on the western edge of the town and its double track main line made a junction with the former company at Cleator Moor West Junction.

The town had several iron ore mines and excessive mining caused subsidence. Some parts of the town have been demolished due to undermining in the area, most notably the original Montreal Primary School and the whole of Montreal Street on which it stood.

The Whitehaven, Cleator and Egremont Railway suffered from subsidence which forced it to build two deviation branch lines and stations. In Cleator Moor itself a new line was built curving further northwest than the original, with a new station being opened in 1866 some 600 yards further west along Leconfield Street than the original, which became a goods station. The new station was known simply as Cleator Moor, but was renamed Cleator Moor East in 1924.

Subsidence also necessitated a deviation at Eskett. As in Cleator Moor itself, a new line was built to the west of the original Eskett station which was retained as a goods station up to 1931. Yeathouse station was opened on the deviation line as a replacement.

The influx of Irish workers gave the town the nickname Little Ireland. World War I and World War II saw a fresh influx of immigrants from mainland Europe to join the settled Irish community.

In 1938, Jakob Spreiregen founded the company Kangol in Cleator, situated across the road from St Mary's Church. The original factory building still stands but empty, since the company ended its association with the town in 2009.

With the decline of traditional industries and the resulting high rate of unemployment, the town's economy is now dependent on the nearby Sellafield complex, which provides jobs to around half the town's people.

Transport
From 1879 Cleator Moor had two railway stations: Cleator Moor East on the Whitehaven, Cleator and Egremont Railway, and Cleator Moor West on the Cleator and Workington Junction Railway. In 1923 both railway companies and their stations passed over to the London Midland and Scottish Railway (LMS). The LMS had acquired shares in the local bus company so to make public transport more lucrative the LMS closed both stations to passengers in 1931.  The goods facilities at Cleator Moor continued into the 1950s.

Cleator Moor now only has one bus service number 30 that passes through the town every half an hour at 18 minutes past and 48 minutes past except on a Sunday.

Sectarian troubles (19th century)
It may be that the Irish Famine prompted some increased migration to the town but links between West Cumbria and the northern counties of Ireland had been established before this time. Labourers crossed to work the harvest and, more permanently, take jobs in the mines and ports long before the Famine often prompted by the constant sub-division of farmland among children. From the 1850s to the 1880s, the population expanded rapidly as rich veins of haematite were exploited. From a settlement of 763 in 1841, Cleator Moor grew to house 10,420 souls by 1871, thirty-six percent of whom were Irish. As Donald MacRaild writes, "...formative economic developments, urban growth and the mass arrival of the Irish, took place entirely in years beyond the Famine." The Irish in Cleator Moor were predominantly Roman Catholic but the general influx into the mines and industry of West Cumbria also brought others of a different persuasion from the same country and with them a particular sectarianism to add to the anti-Catholicism of Victorian England.

During the late 1860s the Irish Protestant preacher William Murphy led anti-Catholic meetings throughout the country inciting mobs to attack Catholic targets. Near Chelmsford in Essex they burnt down a Catholic convent. In May 1868, two chapels a school and over one hundred houses and shops in Ashton-under-Lyme were ransacked. This led to the Catholic populations defending themselves and their buildings and when Murphy visited Whitehaven in April 1871, the Catholic iron ore miners of Cleator Moor were determined to confront him. The local authorities requested Murphy and his Orange Order backers to cancel his talks but they would not. He was heckled and threatened at the first meeting in the Oddfellows Hall, Whitehaven and eventually had to be escorted from the place. The following evening there was more concerted opposition as 200 - 300 Cleator Moor miners marched to the Hall and assaulted Murphy before the meeting began. Five men were sentenced for the attack. Murphy died in March 1872 and his death was attributed to the injuries he had received in Whitehaven. Disturbances in the area were regular during the years that followed particularly when Orangemen assembled on 12 July and on that date in 1884, the most serious of them occurred. That was the year the local Orange Lodges decided to hold their annual gathering at Cleator Moor, a deliberately provocative move: "as if to court disturbance the Orangemen... decided they would this year hold their annual demonstration in the stronghold of the enemy" The marchers including eight bands paraded past the Catholic church and held their assembly at Wath Brow. As the gathering broke up and the Orangemen made their way back to the train station, trouble broke out. They were attacked by groups of local men throwing stones and then rushing them. Some of the marchers carried revolvers, cutlasses and pikes which they now used. A local postal messenger, Henry Tumelty, a 17-year-old Catholic was shot in the head and killed while others were listed as having received injuries from these weapons. The local Catholic priests defended their parishioners saying they had been provoked beyond measure by the foul sectarian tunes and the weaponry. Fr. Wray expressed serious regret: "It has thrown us back at least twenty years."

St Mary's Church
The E.W. Pugin designed Catholic church of St Mary's was consecrated in 1872, replacing the earlier mission church built in 1853. The grounds are home to a meditative walk on the Stations of the Cross and Our Lady's Grotto, a replica of the Grotto at Lourdes, France.

Education
Cleator Moor has a Carnegie library, a grade II listed building which opened in 1906.

The town had two secondary schools but both have closed. St. Cuthbert's stopped functioning in 1977 and in August 2008, after being open for 50 years, the town's other secondary school, Ehenside School was merged with Wyndham School in Egremont, making way for the West Lakes Academy. The academy initially used the Wyndham School buildings until a new academy building was constructed.

Sport
Local amateur rugby league team Wath Brow Hornets won the GMB Union National cup in 2004 and 2005, and the National Conference League in 2012. Local association football team Cleator Moor Celtic F.C. won the County Cup in 1999: the team has supplied players to Sheffield Wednesday, West Bromwich Albion, Bolton Wanderers, Blackpool, Ipswich Town and Carlisle United. England and former Liverpool goalkeeper Scott Carson, who currently plays for Manchester City, was once a member of the team.

Notable people
 Artist L. S. Lowry regularly visited Cleator Moor and Cleator during the 1950s and painted local scenes including the Westminster Bank.
 Andrew Belton the military adventurer, was born in Cleator Moor in 1882.
 Scott Carson, goalkeeper for Manchester City.

See also

Listed buildings in Cleator Moor

References

External links

Cumbria County History Trust: Cleator Moor (nb: provisional research only – see Talk page)
Cleator Moor Town Council
Little Ireland
Guide to Coast to Coast Route

 
Towns in Cumbria
Cumberland
Civil parishes in Cumbria
Borough of Copeland